Alfa Omega is a Romanian broadcaster with a satellite channel and an IPTV station. It started as a distributor of programming working with more than 50 stations in both cable and terrestrial networks inside of Romania.
It now also has operations in Moldova.

References

External links
 Online schedule and details: 

Digital television
Film and video technology
Internet broadcasting
Streaming television
Video on demand services
Television in Romania